Šarec is a Serbian, Montenegrin, Bosnian and Croatian surname. Notable people with the surname include: 

 Dejan Šarac (born 1998), an Austrian football player
 Dino Šarac (born 1990), a Serbian football player
 Dragan Šarac (born 1975), a Serbian football player
 Josip Šarac (born 1998), a Croatian handball player

See also 

 Šarec (surname), a Slovene surname

Serbian surnames
Montenegrin surnames
Bosnian surnames
Croatian surnames